The Henry Dunant Museum is a museum in the Swiss town of Heiden, to preserve the memory and legacy of Henry Dunant, the Founder of the Red Cross Movement, who died in Heiden in 1910, after receiving the first-ever Nobel Prize for Peace in 1901.

The Museum is situated in the nursing home where he lived from 1892 until his death.

External links
Henry Dunant Museum

Museums in Appenzell Ausserrhoden
Henry Dunant
Biographical museums in Switzerland